Jowzurdan may refer to:
 Jowzurdan-e Olya